Pacific Rim: Original Motion Picture Soundtrack is the soundtrack to the film of the same name. It was released on digital download from Amazon.com on June 18, 2013, and CD June 25, 2013. The physical version of the soundtrack was released on July 9, 2013, three days before the theatrical release of the film itself.

The film's score was composed by Ramin Djawadi, with guest musicians Tom Morello and Priscilla Ahn. In addition, the orchestra for the soundtrack consisted of over 100 musicians, including a Russian choir.

Director Guillermo del Toro selected Djawadi based on his work on Prison Break, Iron Man, and Game of Thrones, stating: "His scores have a grandeur, but they have also an incredible sort of human soul." The director also stated that some Russian rap would be featured in the film.

Track listing

Music appearing in the film and not included on the soundtrack

Personnel
Primary artist
Ramin Djawadi – composer, producer

Conductors
Nick Glennie-Smith
Jasper Randall

Orchestrators
Stephen Coleman
Tony Blondal
Andrew Kinney

Additional personnel and recording
Tom Morello – guitar (tracks 1, 9, 18, 21)
Priscilla Ahn – vocals (track 7)

Instrumentation
Strings: 38 violins, 13 violas, 16 cellos, 10 double basses, 1 harp
Woodwind: 1 flute
Brass: 17 French Horns, 5 trumpets, 10 trombones, 4 tubas
4 players on Percussion and 22 members on Male Choir

Critical response
The soundtrack was met with mostly positive reviews. Danny Graydon of Empire rated it four out of five stars, saying, "Ramin Djawadi employs the same muscular stylings that made his Iron Man score so enjoyable." Sherman Yang of MSN gave it a score of four out of five, commenting that "The excellent mix of orchestral and electronic elements makes the title track a perfect start to what one hopes would be a jaw-dropping movie." Filmtracks also gave the soundtrack four out of five stars, commenting that "Pacific Rim is for Djawadi what 2004's Catwoman was for Klaus Badelt, a score maligned because of its ingredients and Media Ventures/Remote Control origins despite containing a remarkable amount of thematic development and appropriate style for the subject matter." James Southall of Movie Wave gave it three-and-a-half out of five stars, commenting that "The guitars, ostinato-based action and even the HORN OF DOOM which make up the opening track may be nothing fresh, but the composer pulls the familiar elements together better than any of his Remote Control peers (including the big boss) have done in a few years." Robert T. Trate of Mania.com gave the soundtrack a grade of A, calling it "a complete kick-ass thrill ride that has the muscle to back it up. Yet, with all the giant monsters and robots, it never loses sight of the heart behind its characters." The Action Elite gave the album a perfect five stars, calling it "A pulse pounding adrenaline rush of music which maintains a theme tune and heart all the way through it."

Chart positions

References

External links
Official website

Pacific Rim (franchise)
2013 soundtrack albums
Film scores
Sony Classical Records soundtracks
WaterTower Music soundtracks
Science fiction soundtracks
Ramin Djawadi soundtracks